Daniel Johnson Jr. (born July 11, 1995) is an American professional baseball outfielder in the San Diego Padres organization. He has played in Major League Baseball (MLB) for the Cleveland Indians.

Amateur career
Johnson was born and raised in Vallejo, California, and attended Jesse M. Bethel High School. In 2013, his senior year, he hit .515. Undrafted in the 2013 Major League Baseball draft, he enrolled at Northeastern Oklahoma A&M College. In 2014, his freshman year, he hit .274 with two home runs and 16 RBIs over 39 games. After the season, he transferred to New Mexico State University where he played baseball for the Aggies. In 2015, his sophomore season, he batted .305 with two home runs and 16 RBIs. As a junior in 2016, he slashed .382/.434/.630 with 12 home runs, fifty RBIs, and 29 stolen bases over 57 games, and was named the Western Athletic Conference Player of the Year.

Professional career

Washington Nationals
Johnson was drafted by the Washington Nationals in the fifth round of the 2016 Major League Baseball draft. In his first professional season in 2016, Johnson hit .265 with a home run and 14 RBIs over 62 games for the Auburn Doubledays. The Nationals reportedly believed in Johnson's potential not just to stick in center field at higher professional levels, but to produce double-digit home runs as he developed.

Johnson was assigned to the Hagerstown Suns for the 2017 season. Almost right away, Johnson demonstrated significantly greater power and hitting ability with the Suns, hitting ten home runs by the end of May and posting a batting average above .300. Johnson's prowess earned him a spot on the South Atlantic League's Northern Division All-Star team, alongside teammate Carter Kieboom. On July 24, 2017, he was promoted to the Advanced-A Potomac Nationals of the Carolina League. A midseason ranking of prospects by MLB Pipeline that month placed Johnson as the Nationals' tenth-best prospect. Johnson finished the 2017 season with a .298 batting average, 22 home runs, 72 RBIs. and 22 stolen bases across both levels, appearing in 130 total games. He was named the Nationals' Minor League Player of the Year for 2017. In 2018, Johnson battled injuries, but still managed to appear in 89 games for the Harrisburg Senators, slashing .267/.321/.410 with six home runs and 31 RBIs.

Cleveland Indians / Guardians
On November 30, 2018, Johnson was traded to the Cleveland Indians, along with Jefry Rodríguez and a player to be named later (who was later announced as Andruw Monasterio), for Yan Gomes. He began 2019 with the Akron RubberDucks and was promoted to the Columbus Clippers on May 25, 2019. That July, he played in the 2019 All-Star Futures Game. Over 123 games between Akron and Columbus, he batted .290 with 19 home runs and 77 RBIs.

Johnson was added to the Indians' 40–man roster following the 2019 season. He made the Indians' Opening Day roster for the 2020 season. Johnson made his major league debut on July 25, going hitless in three at-bats. He batted .083 with no home runs or RBI over 12 at-bats in 2020.

On July 18, 2021, Johnson hit his first career home run, a solo shot off of Oakland Athletics starter Chris Bassitt.

Johnson was designated for assignment by the newly-named Cleveland Guardians on November 19, 2021. After clearing waivers, he was outrighted to the Triple-A Columbus Clippers on November 24, 2021.

He began the 2022 season with Triple-A Columbus. In 17 games, he hit .217/.217/.377 with 3 home runs and 11 RBI.

New York Mets
On May 25, 2022, Johnson was traded to the New York Mets in exchange for cash considerations. Johnson played in 14 games for the Triple-A Syracuse Mets, limping to a .136/.167/.227 line with one home run and 6 RBI. He was released on July 24.

Washington Nationals (second stint)
On July 29, 2022, Johnson signed a minor league contract with the Washington Nationals organization. Johnson played in 26 games for the Triple-A Rochester Red Wings, hitting just .189/.275/.256 with one home run and 8 RBI. He elected free agency on November 10, 2022.

San Diego Padres
On February 23, 2023, Johnson signed a minor league contract with the San Diego Padres organization.

References

External links

1995 births
Living people
Sportspeople from Vallejo, California
Baseball players from California
Major League Baseball outfielders
Cleveland Indians players
New Mexico State Aggies baseball players
Auburn Doubledays players
Hagerstown Suns players
Potomac Nationals players
Mesa Solar Sox players
Gulf Coast Nationals players
Harrisburg Senators players
Salt River Rafters players
Akron RubberDucks players
Columbus Clippers players
Leones del Escogido players
American expatriate baseball players in the Dominican Republic
African-American baseball players
Syracuse Mets players
Florida Complex League Nationals players
St. Lucie Mets players